Noha Sylvestre (born 29 December 1997) is a Swiss international footballer who plays for FC La Chaux-de-Fonds, as a midfielder.

Club career
Sylvestre began his career playing youth football in his native Switzerland for FC Bure, US Boncourt and FC Concordia Basel, before joining West Ham United in 2014. In May 2016, Sylvestre signed his first professional contract with West Ham. On 25 June 2019, following his release from West Ham, Sylvestre signed for Neuchâtel Xamax on a two-year contract. In February 2020, Sylvestre was loaned to fourth tier Swiss side FC Biel-Bienne.

On 1 September 2020, Sylvestre moved to FC La Chaux-de-Fonds on a one-year deal.

International career
In March 2015, Sylvestre was called up for Switzerland U18 for a double header against their English counterparts.

Personal life
Sylvestre's father, Patrick, gained 11 caps for Switzerland during his career.

References

1997 births
Living people
Footballers from Basel
Swiss men's footballers
Swiss expatriate footballers
Association football midfielders
Switzerland youth international footballers
FC Concordia Basel players
West Ham United F.C. players
Neuchâtel Xamax FCS players
FC Biel-Bienne players
FC La Chaux-de-Fonds players
Swiss Super League players
Expatriate footballers in England
Swiss expatriate sportspeople in England